Frea flavomarmorata is a species of beetle in the family Cerambycidae. It was described by Stephan von Breuning in 1935. It is known from the Ivory Coast.

Subspecies
 Frea flavomarmorata flavomarmorata Breuning, 1935
 Frea flavomarmorata minettii Teocchi & al., 2009

References

Endemic fauna of Ivory Coast
flavomarmorata
Beetles described in 1935